Faldaprevir was an experimental drug for the treatment of hepatitis C (HCV). It was being developed by Boehringer-Ingelheim and reached Phase III clinical trials in 2011. Boehringer announced in 2014 that it would not pursue approval of the drug any more because of better HCV treatments having become available.

Mechanism of action
Faldaprevir is a hepatitis C virus protease inhibitor.

Studies
Faldaprevir was tested in combination regimens with pegylated interferon and ribavirin, and in interferon-free regimens with other direct-acting antiviral agents including deleobuvir.

Data from the SOUND-C2 study, presented at the 2012 AASLD Liver Meeting, showed that a triple combination of faldaprevir, deleobuvir, and ribavirin performed well in HCV genotype 1b patients.

References

External links
 Faldaprevir at chem.sis.nlm.nih.gov
 Faldaprevir at chemicalregister.com

Abandoned drugs
Cyclopropanes
NS3/4A protease inhibitors
Quinolines
Tert-butyl compounds
Vinyl compounds
Thiazoles
Carboxamides
Bromoarenes
Cyclopentyl compounds
Pyrrolidines
Carbamates